Nawazish Alam Khan is an Indian politician and member of the Sixteenth Legislative Assembly of Uttar Pradesh. Khan represented the Budhana constituency of Uttar Pradesh and is a member of the Rashtriya Lok Dal political party.

Early life and education
Nawazish Alam Khan was born in Muzaffarnagar, Uttar Pradesh, India in 1979. He holds a Bachelor of Arts degree from Chaudhary Charan Singh University. Prior to joining politics, he was an agriculturist by profession.

Political career
Nawazish Alam Khan was a MLA for one term. He represented Budhana Assembly constituency and was a member of the Samajwadi Party. He is the elder son of former MP Shri Amir Alam Khan. He is currently in Rashtriya Lok Dal.

Posts held

See also
 Samajwadi Party
 Politics of India
 Budhana (Assembly constituency)
 Sixteenth Legislative Assembly of Uttar Pradesh
 Uttar Pradesh Legislative Assembly

References

People from Muzaffarnagar district
1979 births
Samajwadi Party politicians
Living people
Uttar Pradesh MLAs 2012–2017